Takuya Furuya (古谷 拓哉, born July 14, 1981 in Kitami, Hokkaidō) is a Japanese former professional baseball pitcher in Japan's Nippon Professional Baseball. He played for the Chiba Lotte Marines in 2006 and from 2009 to 2016.

External links

NPB

1981 births
Living people
People from Kitami, Hokkaido
Komazawa University alumni
Honolulu Sharks players
Japanese expatriate baseball players in the United States
Nippon Professional Baseball pitchers
Chiba Lotte Marines players
Baseball people from Hokkaido